The Verbotzeit ("time of prohibition" [the grammatically correct German term is Verbotszeit]) refers to the fifteen-month period between 
the collapse of Hitler's Beer Hall Putsch in Munich (9 November 1923), and 
the termination of Bavaria's official ban against the Nazi Party and its organs and instruments (such as the Volkischer Beobachter and the SA) (16 February 1925).

Background
On 24 June 1922 the German Foreign Minister, Walther Rathenau, a Jew who was undertaking to carry out Germany's treaty obligations under the Treaty of Versailles, was assassinated by right-wing terrorists in Berlin while on his way to work. In response, the national government in Berlin, acting through the Reichstag and under the direction of Chancellor Joseph Wirth, promulgated a draconian "Law For the Protection of the Republic" (LFPR). This new national law prohibited gatherings and political parties that were deemed "dangerous" to the Republic. A special court in Leipzig—the Supreme Court for the Protection of the Republic (the Staatsgerichtshof)—was also constituted by the LFPR, and the court was vested with exclusive jurisdiction over violations of the LFPR. The Staatsgerichtshof would consist of nine members who were expressly appointed by the President of the Republic, which would limit the effects of judicial provincialism and particularism. In a move intended to limit the influence of the Republic's conservative (and often monarchical) judiciary, only three of the nine judges were required to be professional jurists; the others could be lay judges.

The Bavarian Landtag, resistant to the central power and jealous of its own "sovereignty," retaliated by enacting a Bavarian law that claimed to suspend the operation of the national law in Bavaria, and to replace the LFPR with its own Bavarian Decree for Protection of the Republic; the Bavarian High Court naturally declared this maneuver to be a legal and effective procedure. The constitutional crisis was resolved by a compromise: the Bavarian Decree was withdrawn, and the national LFPR was amended to provide that a co-equal "southern division" of the new Staatsgerichtshof was established, and that three of the lay judges in that division had to be Bavarian.

Sources

Jablonsky
Toland
Shirer
Kershaw
Large
Morris, Justice Imperilled

Footnotes

Early Nazism (–1933)
Legal history of Germany